Pouteria polysepala is a rare species of plant in the family Sapotaceae. It is endemic to Brazil.  It is threatened by habitat loss and is considered Critically Endangered (CR).  It is known to reside only upon large trees in a forest that is not experiencing heavy flooding. The only known occurrence of Pouteria polysepala is at the mouth of the Rio Javari.

References

Flora of Brazil
polysepala
Critically endangered plants
Taxonomy articles created by Polbot